The Hospital Station is a station on Line 1 of the Monterrey Metro. It is located on Simón Bolivar Avenue near the Universidad Autónoma de Nuevo León (UANL) Medical Campus and the University Hospital (Hospital Civil). This station is located in the Colon Avenue in the northeast side of the Monterrey Centre. The station was opened on 25 April 1991 as part of the inaugural section of Line 1, going from San Bernabé to Exposición.

This station serves the Central Mitras and South Mitras neighborhoods (Colonia Mitras Centro y Mitras Sur), and is accessible for people with disabilities.

This station is named after medical facilities nearby, and its logo represents a hospital.

References

Metrorrey stations
Railway stations opened in 1991
1991 establishments in Mexico